Echemographis is a genus of South American spiders in the family Gnaphosidae, and was first described in 1955 by Caporiacco. , it contains only one species, Echemographis distincta, found in Venezuela. It is possibly a synonym of Camillina.

References

Gnaphosidae
Monotypic Araneomorphae genera
Spiders of South America